The Statue of Robert Falcon Scott commemorates Antarctic explorer Robert Falcon Scott. It is located at the intersection of Oxford Terrace and Worcester Street in the Christchurch Central City, New Zealand. The statue, carved by Scott's widow Kathleen Scott, is registered as a Category II historic place. The statue toppled off its plinth in the February 2011 Christchurch earthquake and broke in two; it was temporarily on display in the Christchurch Earthquake Museum in City Mall. The Scott statue was reinstated in October 2017.

Context

The explorer Scott had used Christchurch and Lyttelton as his New Zealand base for the British National Antarctic Expedition, 1901–1904 and Terra Nova Expedition, 1910–1913. In between, Ernest Shackleton's Nimrod Expedition also used Lyttelton as the base for their attempt to reach the South Pole, but they failed to get there. The objective of the Terra Nova Expedition was to be the first to reach the geographical South Pole. Scott and four companions reached the pole on  1912, to find that a Norwegian team led by Roald Amundsen had preceded them by 33 days. Scott's entire party died on the return journey from the pole. Their deaths resulted in them being treated as heroes throughout the British Empire.

The remaining crew returned to New Zealand and came ashore in British Empire, from where a coded message was cabled to the expedition's organiser in Britain. The fate of the expedition's team became public knowledge on 11 February 1913. A memorial oak was planted in the street leading to the harbourmaster's house, from where the message was relayed. The next memorial was erected in Queenstown, where two stone tablets were attached to a boulder in the Queenstown Gardens. A few months later, a memorial was erected in Port Chalmers, as this was the last harbour where the Terra Nova had visited before proceeding to Antarctica.

History

The Mayor of Christchurch, Henry Holland, called for a public meeting to organise a memorial fund within one week of the news of Scott's death. A committee was formed and over £1,000 was raised. Whilst the form of the memorial or its location had not been decided upon, the committee wrote to Scott's widow and enquired about her thoughts. This resulted in her being engaged to sculpt a statue of her late husband.

The commission was for Kathleen Scott to create a replica of the bronze statue erected in Waterloo Place in London in 1915. The rising costs of metal caused by World War I made marble a more cost effective option. She went to carve the statue in Carrara in Italy in March 1916, as the importation of marble into Britain had been banned. She said about the block that was measuring :

You will be glad to hear that it is a remarkably fine piece of marble, of a good colour and without any flaw whatever. Considering the great size this is very fortunate.

The statue was finished in April 1916, but was not shipped until October of that year due to the war. It was unveiled by the Governor, The Earl of Liverpool, on the corner of Worcester Street and Oxford Terrace on 9 February 1917, facing north and looking towards the building that was then the civic offices. The inscription on the plinth, which is one of his last diary entries, reads:

I do not regret this journey, which shows that Englishmen can endure hardships, help one another, and meet death with as great fortitude as ever in the past.

The inscription had become unreadable by 1922 and a separate marble plaque with this text was installed at the entrance to the reserve. Another plaque lists the names of the five men who died. Recognition grew of Kathleen Scott after the 1995 publication of a biography, and in 1998 a further plaque was added recognising her:

This statue was sculpted by Kathleen Scott FRSBS (1878–1947) Widow of Captain Scott, and was unveiled in 1917.

The statue was not quite finished. The details of the gloves have not been done, and one of the legs rests against a stump to support the figure. Kathleen Scott had offered to undertake this additional work when she returned to Christchurch, but this did not eventuate.

The statue toppled off its plinth by the February 2011 Christchurch earthquake. It broke into two pieces and was put into storage. It was on display during the November 2012 Icefest, and, from January 2016, in Christchurch's Earthquake Museum, which is part of the Canterbury Museum, in City Mall. After restoration, the statue was unveiled a second time on its Oxford Terrace plinth on 6 October 2017.

Heritage listing
On 26 November 1981, the statue was registered by the New Zealand Historic Places Trust as a Category II historic place, with the registration number being 1840. It is one of seven memorials that Kathleen Scott sculpted after her husband's death. It also demonstrates Christchurch's link with Antarctic exploration, being the base for Shackleton and Scott in the past, and being the Gateway to the Antarctic by providing the Italian, New Zealand and United States of America bases these days at Christchurch International Airport.

References

Marble sculptures in New Zealand
Heritage New Zealand Category 2 historic places in Canterbury, New Zealand
Outdoor sculptures in Christchurch
1916 sculptures
2011 Christchurch earthquake
Christchurch Central City
Cultural depictions of Robert Falcon Scott
Sculptures of men in New Zealand
Scott, Robert Falcon
Statues in New Zealand